Central WestGate (previously known as CentralPlaza WestGate) is a large shopping plaza and complex in Bang Yai district, Nonthaburi province, Thailand. The complex, which includes cinemas and stores, is owned by Central Pattana. The mall, located at Bangyai Intersection, opened in August 2015.

See also
List of largest shopping malls in Thailand
List of shopping malls in Bangkok
List of shopping malls in Thailand
List of the world's largest shopping malls

References

External links
 
 Central WestGate 

Shopping malls in Thailand
Central Pattana
Buildings and structures in Nonthaburi province
Shopping malls established in 2015
2015 establishments in Thailand